Satoru Noda may refer to:

 Satoru Noda (artist), Japanese manga artist
 Satoru Noda (footballer), Japanese football player